Vittorio Culpo (1904–1955) was an Italo-French resistance soldier.

Personal life
He was born in Trissino in provincia di Vicenza, Italy, in 1904, in a poor farmer's family. In 1923, after a violent brawl with a fascist squadron, he fled to the mountains. He was actively pursued by Benito Mussolini's military police. He went to France and settled in Moselle, before joining some Italian friends in Auvergne, where he worked peacefully until the beginning  of World War II.

World War involvement 
During the initial year of the war (1939-1940), he fought for the 92nd infantry regiment and obtained French nationality. After the disarmament (1940), he joined the resistance of Val d'Allier. He helped organize a train attack on the Clermont-Ferrand line, when he was severely hurt. He never recovered fully from his injuries.

Later life
He died in 1955 in Mirefleurs. His great grandson, Sébastien Culpo dedicated a short movie to him.

1904 births
1955 deaths
French Resistance members